Lynda Aguirre Thomas (born 21 December 1981), known professionally as Lynda, is a Mexican musician, singer, songwriter and activist. She achieved recognition in her native Mexico during the 1990s and early 2000s. She was signed to EMI Capitol Records and released four studio albums. Her last album, Polen, was released in 2001 and she retired shortly afterwards.

Early life and musical debut

Thomas was born in Tijuana, Baja California, Mexico, on 21 December 1981. In 1989, she took part in the TV singing contest Fantasía Musical featured in Siempre en Domingo. Soon after, she moved to Mexico City and was supported by her sister Alissa (Rosangel), "Max" Di Carlo, Tino Geizer and her husband Carlos Lara, by then, he was her brother-in-law. The song "Cantemos Juntos", was released in 1989 under Melody records and later included on the LP compilation Los Triunfadores de Fantasía Musical.

Career

1995–1998 

In 1994, Thomas signed with EMI-Capitol. In 1995, at the age of 13, Thomas recorded her debut album Lynda, which was officially released in early 1996. It contained the single  "Inseparables" and "Gira Que Gira", which became the commercial breakout of the album; Soon after, Thomas released the single "Blue Jeans". She continued her studies during her early career. She also released the single "El Amor No Tiene Edad" (Love Has No Age). At the age of 14, she received the "Revelation Artist" award by Televisa.

In 1997, at the age of 15, Thomas released the albumUn Grito En El Corazón. the first single taken from the album was "Dile" (Tell Him). Thomas was commissioned to record the music for the 1997 Ringling Bros. and Barnum & Bailey Circus tour through the Americas, and performed live on selected dates. In December 1997, Thomas released a dance version of Jingle Bells.

Later, in December of that year, she was involved in a homage to Pope John Paul II alongside other singers, the song was "Pescador Juan Pablo II", and received the Medal of Merit from Vatican.

1998–2000: Independencia 

In early 1998, Thomas moved to Los Angeles, CA, to begin recording "Mi Día de la Independencia", alongside her producers and Vinnie Colaiuta, it was finished recording in late 1998; the album was released around the world in early 1999, when Lynda Thomas had just turned 17.

Thomas first released the single "No Quiero Verte", (I Don't Wanna See You), an alternative rock track 

Her second physical single was  "Maldita Timidez" (Damn Shyness), it was her second consecutive Ibero-American No. 1 of 1999; the music video, which featured actor Héctor Arredondo in his first professional acting work.

"Corazón Perdido" (Lost Heart), was the last  single from the 1990s released by Thomas

Subsequently, in early 2000, the musician released officially the acoustic ballad "Ahí Estaré" (I'll Be There); first, the studio version won significative airplay on the radio in 1999.

She also worked for the TV ad campaign of Sabritas snacks company, with an adaptation of her successful single "Corazón Perdido".

In July 2000, Thomas released the song "A 1000 X Hora" (A Thousand Per Hour) in 12" inch and EP formats; it was written by Thomas about her eating and mental disorders; She recorded the title track for the telenovela Primer Amor: A mil por hora.

Thomas also performed at the 2000 Chilean telethon, held at Estadio Nacional in Santiago de Chile.

2001–2002: Polen

In April 2001, Thomas released the last album in her career, "Polen", when she was 19 years old.

Before the official release of "Polen", on Sunday, February 25, 2001, Thomas performed 3 songs at Festival de Viña Del Mar held in Chile.

The first single taken from "Polen" was the alternative track "Lo Mejor De Mí" (The Best Of Me).
 
Meanwhile, Thomas hosted alongside Colombian rock-singer Juanes in the first original edition of the Nickelodeon Kids' Choice Awards LatinAmerica, held in Santa Monica, California, in 2001.

Last days in the music industry - "Ay, Ay, Ay" - "Amar Así"

In November 2001, Thomas released at the request of her record label the teen pop-punk single Mala Leche ("Nasty Person"), in Spain, Argentina and Chile; for the song, Thomas recorded the last music video in her career.

On April 11 and 23, 2002 the studio album Polen was remastered and re-released only in the United States to increase the popularity of the album; it coincided with the American Nickelodeon Kids' Choice Awards show hosted by Thomas for the IberoAmerican broadcasting, in which she conducted interviews with several actors and music groups of that time including Jennifer Love Hewitt, Mike Myers, Dana Carvey, O-Town, No Secrets, Antonio Banderas, Melanie Griffith or Ashley Judd among others.

She also released the last official single in her career, "Para Ti" (It's For You), a semi-acoustic track which reached Top ten in some countries. It was also the last musical theme that Thomas performed live in her career, it happened in May 2002.

2002–present: Retirement

In May 2002, at the age of 20, Thomas retired from music and public life.

She provided backing vocals for other singers including RBD, Kudai and Eme 15.

Sudden absence from public life

From 2002 to April 2018, she was absent from the public eye. On April 19, 2018, she made her first post on her new Twitter account, @LyndaThomasOf, briefly addressing her extended absence. On April 24, she posted a video going into detail. She is now a mother to a boy named Noah, and she married her songwriter Carlos Lara, who previously was the husband of her sister Alissa Rosangel.

Discography

Studio albums / Singles

Reissues

Extended plays

Discography as a songwriter, record producer, assistant work and backup vocals

- (Uncredited work and songs credited to Thomas after 2002 are not included)
Alissa - Alissa Rosángel (1993) 
Teletón (Mexico) (Compilation live albums) (1996-2001)
Estrellas de Navidad (1997)
Juan Pablo II Homenaje (1998)
Primer amor... a mil por hora (2000) (writer, producer)
Clase 406 (2002) (writer, producer)

Filmography

See also
 List of animal rights advocates

References

External links
 
 
 Lynda discography at Discogs

1981 births
Alternative rock singers
Capitol Records artists
Eurodance musicians
Women post-grunge singers
Indie rock musicians
Mexican women singer-songwriters
Mexican singer-songwriters
Mexican songwriters
People from Tijuana
Singers from Baja California
Mexican women's rights activists
Mexican people of Welsh descent
Women in electronic music
Living people
21st-century Mexican singers
21st-century Mexican women singers